New Garia is a neighbourhood located in the eastern part of Garia, Kolkata, India. It is bounded by Chak Garia and Panchasayar to the north, Baishnabghata-Patuli and Briji to the west, Garia railway station and Kamalgazi to the south and Nayabad and Sreenagar to the east.

Transport

New Garia is home to two major bus termini (popularly named as C-5 and 206 after the routes they originally used to serve) and is connected by all varieties of bus services to all parts of the city.

See also
 Tentulberia
 Kamalgazi
 Kolkata Metro Railway Routes (North South Corridor)
 Kolkata Suburban Railway
 Eastern Metropolitan Bypass

References

External links
 
 New Garia at mapsofindia.com

Neighbourhoods in Kolkata